This is a list of Missouri Confederate Civil War units, or military units from the state of Missouri which fought for the Confederacy in the American Civil War. A border state with both southern and northern influences, Missouri attempted to remain neutral when the war began. However, this was unacceptable to the Federal government, and Union military forces moved against the capital to arrest the legislature and the governor. Governor Claiborne Jackson called out the Missouri State Guard to resist. Union forces under Gen. Nathaniel Lyon seized the state capital, and a minority of pro-Union members of the legislature declared the governor removed from office. They appointed a pro-Union governor, and the Federal government recognized him even though he had not been elected. This resulted in a civil war within the state, as Missourians divided and joined both the Union and Confederate armies. Missouri sent representatives to the United States Congress and the Confederate States Congress, and was represented by a star on both flags.

Early in 1861, the Missouri State Guard was formed as a replacement to a state militia force that had previously been in existence.  Sterling Price was selected by Governor Jackson to command the unit.  Volunteers for the Missouri State Guard were organized into companies of 50 to 100 men, which were then assigned to regiments.  Each regiment was designed to contain between six and eight companies, so a Missouri State Guard regiment would contain 600 to 800 men at full strength.  At the Battle of Wilson's Creek on August 10, 1861, Missouri State Guard units fought alongside Confederate States Army troops; both the Missourians and the Confederate troops were under the command of Confederate Brigadier General Benjamin McCulloch.  Beginning on November 25, 1861, the men of the Missouri State Guard were allowed to transfer from the Guard to official Confederate service.  At the Battle of Pea Ridge in March 1862, Price commanded a mixed force that contained both Confederate soldiers from Missouri and elements of the Missouri State Guard.  By July 1862, almost all of the Missouri State Guard had left the unit to join Confederate States Army units.

The list of Missouri Union Civil War units is shown separately.

Infantry

 1st Missouri Brigade
 1st Infantry (1st-4th Consolidated Infantry)
 2nd Infantry (2nd-6th Consolidated Infantry)
 3rd Infantry (3rd-5th Consolidated Infantry)
 4th Infantry (1st-4th Consolidated Infantry)
 5th Infantry (3rd-5th Consolidated Infantry)
 6th Infantry (2nd-6th Consolidated Infantry)
 8th Infantry
 9th Infantry
 10th Infantry
 11th Infantry
 12th Infantry
 16th Infantry
 Winston's Regiment, Infantry
 1st Battalion, Infantry
 3rd Battalion, Infantry
 8th Battalion, Infantry
 Perkins' Battalion, Infantry

Sharpshooters
 9th Battalion, Sharpshooters
 Searcy's Battalion, Sharpshooters

Cavalry

 Shelby's Iron Brigade
 1st Cavalry (1st-3rd Btln. Consolidated Cavalry)
 1st Northeast Cavalry
 2nd Cavalry (formerly 4th Battalion)
 2nd Northeast Cavalry (Franklin's Regiment)
 3rd Cavalry
 4th Cavalry
 5th Cavalry
 6th (Phelan's) Cavalry
 6th Cavalry (Coffee's, 11th Cavalry, 3rd Trans-Mississippi Cavalry)
 7th Cavalry
 8th Cavalry
 9th (Elliott's) Cavalry (formerly 10th Battalion)
 10th Cavalry (formerly 11th Battalion)
 12th Cavalry
 13th (Wood's) Cavalry (formerly 14th Battalion)
 15th Cavalry
 Coleman's Regiment, Cavalry (incomplete)
 Freeman's Regiment, Cavalry (formerly Freeman's Battalion)
 Fristoe's Regiment, Cavalry
 Hunter's Regiment, Cavalry
 Jackman's Regiment, Cavalry
 Lawther's Temporary Regiment, Dismounted Cavalry
 Poindexter's Regiment, Cavalry
 Slayback's Regiment, Cavalry
 Williams' Regiment, Cavalry
 3rd Battalion, Cavalry (1st-3rd Btln. Consolidated Cavalry)
 17th (Norman's) Battalion, Cavalry
 Clardy's Battalion, Cavalry
 Davies' Battalion, Cavalry
 Ford's Battalion, Cavalry
 Preston's Battalion, Cavalry
 Schnabel's Battalion, Cavalry
 Shaw's Battalion, Cavalry
 Snider's Battalion, Cavalry
 Williams' Battalion, Cavalry
 Beck's Company, Cavalry
 Hick's Company, Cavalry
 Hobbs' Company, Cavalry
 Stallard's Company, Cavalry
 Woodson's Company, Cavalry - This company of exchanged Missourians was formed in Virginia in 1863 by Charles Woodson and E.H. Scott to serve in Virginia and they were designated the 1st Missouri Cavalry, Co. A. They were attached to the 62nd Virginia Mounted Infantry and fought at the Battle of New Market in 1864 where they sustained heavy casualties.

Mounted Infantry
 Boone's Regiment, Mounted Infantry

Artillery
 1st Battery, Light Artillery
 1st Field Battery, Light Artillery
 2nd Field Battery, Light Artillery
 3rd Battery, Light Artillery
 3rd Field Battery, Light Artillery
 4th (Harris') Field Battery, Light Artillery
 13th Missouri Battery, Light Artillery
 Farris' Battery, Light Artillery (Clark Artillery)
 Hamilton's (Prairie Gun) Battery, Light Artillery
 Barret's Company, Light Artillery
 Bledsoe's Company, Light Artillery
 Landis' Company, Light Artillery
 Lowe's Company, Artillery (Jackson Battery)
 McDonald's Company, Light Artillery
 Parson's Company, Light Artillery
 von Phul's Company, Light Artillery
 Walsh's Company, Light Artillery

Misc
 Dorsey's Regiment, State Guard
 Douglas' Regiment
 Lawther's Partisan Rangers
 Parsons' Regiment
 Quantrill's Company
 Missouri State Guard
 Thompson's Command

Arkansas soldiers in Missouri units
 
In addition to serving in Confederate units organized in Arkansas, many Arkansas soldiers would serve in Confederate units organized in Missouri. Because Missouri Confederate troops were effectively driven out of the geographic area of Missouri after the Pea Ridge Campaign, except during raids by Generals Marmaduke, Shelby and Price, many of the Missouri units recruited heavily in Arkansas.  This practice led some Missouri units to be mislabeled as Arkansas units when Confederate service records were compiled by the United States War Department in the 1880s, and some Arkansas units being mislabeled as Missouri units. Troops living near the borders with other states often enlisted in the nearest unit, even if across the state line, resulting in Arkansas soldiers enlisting in units from Missouri, Louisiana and Tennessee.  The following is a list of Missouri units that contained large numbers of Arkansas soldiers:

See also
Lists of American Civil War Regiments by State
Confederate Units by State

References

Sources
 

 
Missouri
Civil War